The Treaty or Convention of Altranstädt was signed between Charles XII of Sweden and Joseph I, Holy Roman Emperor on 31 August 1707. It settled the rights of Protestants in Silesia.

Historical context
While the Protestant Reformation had strongly affected Silesia, the Habsburg emperors had subjected the province to the Counter-Reformation in the 18th century. In Upper Silesia, in particular, these measures were successful: in the early 18th century, almost half of the Silesian population was Roman Catholic and some 1,000 churches had been rededicated from Protestant to Roman Catholic. The Peace of Westphalia (1648) protected Protestants only in the duchies of Brieg, Liegnitz, Münsterberg, Öls, Wohlau and in the city of Breslau. In the duchies of Jauer, Glogau and Schweidnitz, the Protestants were allowed to maintain three "peace churches" (Friedenskirchen) outside the city walls. After 1675, only Breslau and the Duchy of Oels were spared from the counter-reformation, the "peace churches" were dissolved, despite the protests of Sweden and Protestant states of the Holy Roman Empire.

During the Great Northern War, Charles XII of Sweden had marched his armies through Silesia and occupied the Electorate of Saxony, where he forced his adversary, elector August the Strong, into the Treaty of Altranstädt (1706).

Terms and implementation

During his stay in Saxon Altranstädt near Leipzig, Charles XII negotiated a further treaty with the Habsburg emperor. Joseph I agreed to return several churches to the Protestant communities, and to permit the erection of six "mercy churches". The "mercy churches" were erected in Freystadt, Hirschberg, Landeshut, Militsch, Sagan and Teschen, 125 churches were returned. Joseph I dispensed with any further counter-reformatory policies. Three Protestant consistories were permitted, restoring and stabilizing Silesian Lutheranism.

The treaty was negotiated in Altranstädt from April 1707. Joseph I signed this convention in order to prevent Charles XII from entering the War of the Spanish Succession on the French side, and held onto strict Roman Catholic policies in his other hereditary lands. When Silesia became a Prussian province in 1742, the Protestant Prussian king in the Peace of Breslau safeguarded the Roman Catholics' rights and possessions.

Sources

References

Bibliography

Altranstadt
1707 treaties
Altranstädt
Habsburg Silesia
Treaties of the Swedish Empire
1707 in the Holy Roman Empire
1707 in Sweden
Holy Roman Empire–Sweden relations
Joseph I, Holy Roman Emperor